Ernest "Eddie" Peirce (25 September 1909 – 23 January 1998) was a South African boxer who competed in the 1932 Summer Olympics in Los Angeles.

He was born in Somerset West and died in Apache Junction, Arizona, United States.

In 1932 he won the bronze medal in the middleweight classification after winning the third-place fight against Roger Michelot of France by walkover.

Two years earlier, Peirce won the middleweight bronze medal at the 1930 British Empire Games.

He is buried in the National Memorial Cemetery of Arizona in Phoenix.

1932 Olympic results
Below are the results of Ernest Peirce, a South African middleweight boxer, who competed at the 1932 Los Angeles Olympics:
 Round of 16: bye
 Quarterfinal: defeated Lajos Szigeti (Hungary) on points
 Semifinal: lost to Carmen Barth (United States) on points
 Bronze Medal Match:  won by walkover versus Roger Michelot (France)

External links
 

1909 births
1998 deaths
People from Somerset West
Middleweight boxers
Olympic boxers of South Africa
Boxers at the 1932 Summer Olympics
Olympic bronze medalists for South Africa
Boxers at the 1930 British Empire Games
Commonwealth Games bronze medallists for South Africa
Olympic medalists in boxing
Medalists at the 1932 Summer Olympics
South African emigrants to the United States
People from Apache Junction, Arizona
South African male boxers
Commonwealth Games medallists in boxing
White South African people
Sportspeople from the Western Cape
Medallists at the 1930 British Empire Games